Rachel Louise Batterham  is a British physician who is a professor of Obesity, Diabetes and Endocrinology at University College London. She established the University College London Hospitals NHS Foundation Trust Bariatric Centre for Weight Management and Metabolic Surgery. She has extensively studied obesity, and has contributed to clinical management and the understanding of obesity-related diseases.

Early life and education 

Batterham was an undergraduate medical student at Imperial College London, where she was based at St Mary's Hospital. She completed her speciality training in diabetes and endocrinology. As part of her training, she became particularly interested in obesity. After her residency, she worked toward a master's degree in biochemistry. She eventually completed a doctorate in the regulation of body weight.

Research and career 
In 2005, Batterham was appointed a consultant at the University College London Hospitals NHS Foundation Trust, where she set up a service for the management of obesity. She was eventually promoted to Professor of Obesity, Diabetes and Endocrinology, and appointed Obesity theme lead for the UCL National Institute for Health and Care Research Biomedical Research Centre.

Batterham identified that a genetic variation in the FTO gene can make people more likely to become obese. People with the obesity-risk variant have higher circulating levels of ghrelin in their blood, which means that they feel hungry even after having a meal.

In 2016, Batterham was awarded an Research Professorship by the National Institute for Health and Care Research (NIHR). She looked to improve the health of people with obesity. Whilst bariatric surgery can cause long-term weight loss, it can be difficult to access and does not always improve human health. Batterham sought to understand whether genotypes could be used to determine whether or not someone respond well to bariatric surgery. She investigated whether exercise or pharmaceutical interventions could improve weight loss and health outcomes. Batterhman believes that health inequalities perpetuate obesity amongst people from lower socio-economic backgrounds.

Batterham founded the Obesity Empowerment Network in 2019. The charity looks to empower and engage people of all ages who have obesity. In 2022, she created a documentary on obesity and how the phenomenon can be addressed.

Awards and honours 
 2015 Diabetes UK Rank Fund Nutrition Prize
 2016 Appointed to the Council of the British Obesity and Metabolic Surgery Society
 2016 Andre Mayer award from the World Obesity Federation 
 2018 Royal Society of Medicine's Steven's Lecture
 2017 Sir Jules Thorn Award for Biomedical Award
 2018 Crick Lecture
 2022 Appointed Order of the British Empire in the Platinum Jubilee Civic Honours

Selected publications

References 

Alumni of Imperial College London
Academics of University College London
21st-century British medical doctors
Living people
Year of birth missing (living people)
Members of the Order of the British Empire
Obesity researchers
NIHR Research Professors